The Samsonadzes is a Georgian computer-animated sitcom created and produced by Shalva Ramishvili. It first aired in Georgia in November 2009 and ended sometime in 2010. It almost immediately became a "hit", "taking Georgia by storm" and "shooting to the number two spot among the most-popular shows on one of Georgia's main TV channels". It has been described as "bearing more than a passing resemblance" to the American animated television sitcom The Simpsons. Despite this, most people have started to identify the show as a “ripoff” or "mockbuster"/ "bootleg" of The Simpsons.

The Samsonadzes are "a yellow-skinned cartoon family, consisting of a dopey husband" (Gela Samsonadze, who works in a bank) "and his lavishly coiffed wife, who live in a made-up city with their children", Shorena and Gia. They also have a parrot, Koke. Their home city has been noted for its apparent resemblance to Tbilisi.

Ramishvili has stated that the series aimed to be "relevant to Georgian reality and touch on social issues that will resonate with a Georgian audience", while its chief scriptwriter, Zviad Bliadze, explained: "We just took an average family and made a parody of the common traits, like laziness or love of alcohol."

The series has attracted some attention by featuring Russian leaders in a negative light, in a context of tense Georgia–Russia relations. Russian Prime Minister Vladimir Putin appears in one episode, sending a spy into Georgia. Ramishvili described this criticism of the Russian government as "simply our civil liberty and duty". The Independent, however, has remarked that there are "no plans to introduce the controversial Georgian President, Mikheil Saakashvili" into the programme, and Russia Today has noted that the series' creators "make lots of fun of Russian politicians, while forgetting their own."

Episodes

References

External links

The Simpsons
2009 Georgia (country) television series debuts
Georgian adult animated comedy television series
Animated satirical television series
Computer-animated television series
Television sitcoms in Georgia (country)
Television shows set in Georgia (country)
Animated television series spinoffs
2000s Georgia (country) television series
2000s adult animated television series
Cultural depictions of Vladimir Putin
2010 television series endings
Imedi TV original programming